The women's duet was one of two events in the synchronised swimming program at the 1988 Summer Olympics. The final was held on 1 October.

Results

Technical figures

Qualification

Final

References

1988
1988 in women's sport
Women's events at the 1988 Summer Olympics